Chobanian (in Armenian Չոպանեան or Չոպանյան) is an Armenian surname. It may refer to:

Aram Chobanian (born 1929), ninth President of Boston University
Arshag Chobanian (1872–1954), Armenian short story writer, journalist, editor, poet, translator, literary critic, playwright, philologist, and novelist
Loris Ohannes Chobanian (born 1933), Iraqi-born Armenian-American composer of classical music, conductor, and guitar and lute teacher and performer

See also
Chobani (disambiguation)